Gur Khar (also Romanized as Gūr-e Khār, Gur-i-Khar, and Gūr Khar; also known as Ghūr Khar) is a village in Holayjan Rural District, in the Central District of Izeh County, Khuzestan Province, Iran. At the 2006 census, its population was 48, in 10 families.

References 

Populated places in Izeh County